West Catholic Preparatory High School is a co-educational Catholic high school in the Archdiocese of Philadelphia. It is located in Philadelphia, Pennsylvania, at 45th and Chestnut Streets, the University City neighborhood of West Philadelphia.

History
The school opened on September 8, 1989, as a result of a merger between West Philadelphia Catholic High School for Boys, opened in 1916, and West Philadelphia Catholic Girls High School, opened in 1927.

When they originally opened, both West Catholic Girls and West Catholic Boys served students from West Philadelphia, Southwest Philadelphia and Delaware County.  As more Archdiocesan high schools opened in the suburbs in the 1950s and 1960s, West's "feeder schools" became limited to parishes in West and Southwest Philadelphia. With the advent of "open enrollment" for Archdiocesan high schools in the 1990s, West Catholic continued to draw from West and Southwest Philadelphia, and also attracted students from Philadelphia and its suburbs. Currently (2011), approximately 25% of the students come from suburban areas, with the other 75% from across the City of Philadelphia.

In 2012 there was a proposal to close the school.

In July 2013, the school announced its official name change to West Catholic Preparatory High School, as part of its overall strategic plan.

Academics
Based on the school's student focus and support; school organization and culture; challenging standards and curriculum; active teaching and learning; professional community; leadership and educational vitality; school, family, and community partnerships, and indicators of success the Blue Ribbon Schools program (in affiliation with the United States Department of Education) has awarded West Catholic the prestigious 'Blue Ribbon School of Excellence' recognition several times.

West Philadelphia Catholic High School for Boys was named a Blue Ribbon School of Excellence by the Blue Ribbon Schools program in the academic year of 1983-1984 
Co-Educational West Philadelphia Catholic High School was also named a Blue Ribbon School of Excellence by the Blue Ribbon Schools program in the academic years of 1994-1996.

West Catholic graduates have gone on to Swarthmore, NYU, Georgetown, Columbia, Stanford, Harvard, and the University of Pennsylvania, among others. 
West Catholic graduates earned scholarships such as Hispanic Heritage Youth Awards, Gates Millennium Scholarships, Nelson Scholarships, Mayor's Scholarships, and an F.C. Haab Science Scholarship.

The Brothers of the Christian Schools
West Catholic's faculty includes a number of Catholic religious orders, most notably, the Institute of the Brothers of the Christian Schools, also known as the Christian Brothers.  The Christian Brothers are a Roman Catholic lay religious teaching order, founded by French Priest Saint Jean-Baptiste de la Salle. De La Salle was a canon of the cathedral and came from a wealthy family. De La Salle's goal was setting up free schools where the children of the working and poor class citizens could learn reading, writing and arithmetic and also receive religious instruction and other training appropriate for forming good Christians.

The Christian Brothers taught at West Catholic Boys beginning in 1926 (succeeding the Brothers of Mary).  Sisters, Servants of the Immaculate Heart of Mary (IHM) and the Sisters of St. Joseph (Chestnut Hill) are two of the women's religious teaching orders from West Catholic Girls. In addition to the religious orders, the school's faculty includes a number of lay teachers.  The Chaplain is a priest of the Archdiocese of Philadelphia.

Partnerships
As a resident of the University City, West Catholic Preparatory High School has taken advantage of its unique location by establishing a partnership with several universities in Philadelphia:
University of Pennsylvania
Drexel University
University of the Sciences of Philadelphia

Athletics

West Catholic is a member of the Philadelphia Catholic League Blue Division, which comprises schools with smaller enrollment. They currently offer the following sports at the varsity level:
Girls' Volleyball
Football
Cheerleading
Boys' Basketball
Girls' Basketball
Girls' Indoor/Outdoor Track
Boys' Indoor/Outdoor Track
Cross-Country

Football championship history
West Catholic has won several football championships.  The following is a listing of the championship wins, the year they were won, and the winning head coach:
Tom Tracey- 1925
Jocko McGarry- 1932
Bob Dougherty- 1940, 1941, 1943, 1944
Bill McCoy- 1945, 1946
Jack Shields- 1951
Vince McAneny- 1962
John McAneny- 1965
Brian Fluck- 2006, 2007, 2008, 2009, 2010, 2011, 2012, 2013, 2015, 2016

State AA Champion 2010

Basketball
West Catholic has won a number of men's basketball championships:

Brother Michael Quinlan- 1921
Jocko McGarry- 1931
Pat Conway- 1938
Joe Langan- 1949
Jim Usilton, Jr- 1952, 1953, 1955
Bill Ludlow- 1959
In 1971 West Philadelphia Catholic High School for Girls won the city championship at the Palestra.

In 1974 West Philadelphia Catholic High School for Girls won the city championship.

Notable alumni

Nia Ali, female sprinter, silver medalist at Rio Olympics in 2016 on 100 metres hurdles
Peter Boyle, actor
Michael Brooks, former NBA basketball player and captain of 1980 Olympic Basketball team
John D. Caputo, philosopher and theologian, Thomas J. Watson Professor of Religion Emeritus at Syracuse University and David R. Cook Professor of Philosophy Emeritus at Villanova University
Big Daddy Graham (1953–2021), comedian, writer, actor, recording artist and sports radio personality on 94 WIP-FM.
Philip Hart, former United States Senator (D-Michigan) and lawyer
Jim Lynam, CSN Philly analyst and former collegiate and NBA basketball coach
Herb Magee, head basketball coach for Philadelphia University and former NBA basketball player
Joseph Mark McShea, founding bishop of Allentown
Gerry Mulligan: Jazz Legend (Baritone Sax)
Jim Murray, co-founder of the Ronald McDonald House and a former general manager of the Philadelphia Eagles
Malcolm Nance, U.S. Navy senior chief petty officer, author, television commentator
John Joseph Cardinal O'Connor, Archbishop of New York, 1984-2000.
Peter O'Keefe, Pennsylvania State Representative, 1975-1978
Jon Polito: Actor (Multiple Coen Bros. movies including Miller's Crossing and The Big Lebowski; also Modern Family and Seinfeld). (See 1968 West Catholic Boys High School Year Book)
Thomas Rienzi, Lt. General US Army and Catholic Deacon
Jaelen Strong, NFL wide receiver for the Houston Texans
Jim Washington, a former NBA basketball player
Paul Westhead, Coached champion teams in both NBA and WNBA.

Student body
There are 427 students attending West Catholic:

Ethnicity

Black - 80%
White - 3%
Asian - 6%
Hispanic - 11%
Other

References

Further reading
  - At the time of writing, the archdiocese planned to close the school

External links

West Catholic Preparatory High School
http://schools.privateschoolsreport.com/Pennsylvania|Philadelphia/WestPhiladelphiaCatholicHig.html

Roman Catholic secondary schools in Philadelphia
Roman Catholic Archdiocese of Philadelphia
Irish-American culture in Philadelphia
Educational institutions established in 1916
1916 establishments in Pennsylvania
University City, Philadelphia